{{Taxobox
| name = Tapesia acuformis
| regnum = Fungi
| phylum = Ascomycota
| classis = Ascomycetes
| ordo = Helotiales
| familia = Dermateaceae
| genus = Tapesia
| species = T. acuformis
| binomial = Tapesia acuformis
| binomial_authority = Boerema, R. Pieters & Hamers) Crous
| synonyms = 
Oculimacula acuformis (Boerema, R. Pieters & Hamers) Crous & W. Gams
Ramulispora acuformis (Nirenberg) Crous 1995
Tapesia yallundae var. acuformis Boerema, R. Pieters & Hamers 1992
}}Tapesia acuformis is the causal agent for a variety of cereal and forage grass diseases. The anamorph of T. acuformis was formerly known as the R-type strain of Pseudocercosporella herpotrichoides. The W-type strain of Pseudocercosporella herpotrichoides is now known as Tapesia yallundae''.

See also 
 List of rye diseases
 List of wheat diseases

References 

Fungal plant pathogens and diseases
Rye diseases
Wheat diseases
Dermateaceae